North Bay Village is a city located in Miami-Dade County, Florida. As of the 2020 census, the city had a total population of 8,159.

The total area is 60.31% water. The city consist of three islands; Harbor Island, North Bay Island and Treasure Island. The Islands are located in Biscayne Bay between Miami and Miami Beach along the 79th Street Causeway.

Surrounding areas

  Biscayne Bay
  Biscayne Bay    Biscayne Bay
 Biscayne Bay, Miami   Biscayne Bay, Miami Beach
  Biscayne Bay    Biscayne Bay
  Biscayne Bay

History

Early years
Prior to 1940, most of what is now North Bay Village lay beneath the waters of Biscayne Bay. The only dry land was Broadcast Key, a  island from which pioneer radio station WIOD began broadcasting in 1926. 

Today, television station WSVN-TV maintains its headquarters at this same site, now joined with Treasure Island. WIOD moved inland during the mid-2010s.

In 1940, dredging and bulk-heading created North Bay Island. By 1941, palm-lined streets had been laid out, and 12 homes had been built and occupied. Today, the island has grown into a neighborhood of single-family residences.

During the mid-1940s, dredging and filling created Harbor Island and Treasure Island. Harbor Island is composed primarily of multi-family buildings. Treasure Island, whose street names were drawn from Robert Louis Stevenson's novel Treasure Island, is a mixture of single-family dwellings on the westerly end and multi-family dwellings on the eastern end.

1945-present
North Bay Village was incorporated in 1945. Harbor and Treasure Islands were annexed several years later. Broadcast Key, also known as Cameo Island, was annexed in 1963. During its early years, North Bay Village was primarily a haven for winter residents. 

The City became widely known for its popular restaurants and nightclubs, which attracted celebrities like Frank Sinatra and Judy Garland. Dean Martin had a nightclub in North Bay Village in the late 1960s and early 1970s called Dino's. It was next to  Jilly Rizzo's club, Jilly's.

Most of today's residents live in the village year-round.

Most construction in North Bay Village since the year 2000 has been in the development of high-rise luxury condominium buildings such as the 360 condominium, Space 01 Condo, Eloquence on the Bay, and Grandview Palace Marina.

Demographics

2020 census

As of the 2020 United States census, there were 8,159 people, 3,398 households, and 1,861 families residing in the city.

2010 census 

As of 2010, there were 4,572 households, out of which 26.4% were vacant. In 2000, 21.6% had children under the age of 18 living with them, 32.7% were married couples living together, 11.2% had a female householder with no husband present, and 51.5% were non-families. 38.7% of all households were made up of individuals, and 8.4% had someone living alone who was 65 years of age or older. The average household size was 2.10 and the average family size was 2.85.

2000 census 
In 2000, the city population was spread out, with 16.8% under the age of 18, 8.8% from 18 to 24, 42.0% from 25 to 44, 20.2% from 45 to 64, and 12.1% who were 65 years of age or older. The median age was 35 years. For every 100 females, there were 100.8 males. For every 100 females age 18 and over, there were 100.4 males.

In 2000, the median income for a household in the city was $34,354, and the median income for a family was $37,931. Males had a median income of $31,740 versus $27,234 for females. The per capita income for the city was $21,017. 12.9% of the population and 7.8% of families were below the poverty line. Out of the total population, 13.6% of those under the age of 18 and 9.3% of those 65 and older were living below the poverty line.

As of 2000, speakers of Spanish as a first language was spoken by 53.30%, while English accounted for 33.40%, Portuguese was 9.11%, French at 1.35%, and Italian was at 1.16% of the population.

Economy

Among the companies based in North Bay Village are the cable channels GOL TV.  WSVN - Sunbeam Television Corporation.  WIOD Radio, had been based at North Bay Village for years before being consolidated with other radio facilities in Broward County.  Signage for WIOD can still be seen on the building to the east of WSVN-TV, (WCKT) the Fox affiliate for the region.  WSVN (WCKT) has maintained its studios in North Bay Village since 1956.  North Bay Village is often labeled the "Radio City of South Florida" due to its broadcasting legacy. (WIOD and WSVN (WCKT) began as affiliates of NBC.)

In recent years, North Bay Village has been opening restaurants in the surrounding area to increase quality of the city and generate more revenue. Such restaurants include 222 Taco, Sushi Erika, Benihana, and Shuckers

Government

The village maintains its own police department. Carlos Noriega is currently the Chief of Police. There are (4) Commissioners and (1) Mayor. Current Commissioners are Andy Rotondaro, Goran Cuk, Richard Chervony, and Rachel Streitfeld. Mayor is Brent Lathem.   

City hall is located at 1666 John F. Kennedy Causeway, North Bay Village, Florida.

Education

Miami-Dade County Public Schools is the local school district. Treasure Island Elementary School is in the village. In addition to Treasure Island it serves Normandy Island and the north Bay Causeway Islands. Miami Beach Nautilus Middle School and Miami Beach Senior High School serve North Bay Village.

References

External links

 North Bay Village

Cities in Miami-Dade County, Florida
Islands of Miami-Dade County, Florida
Cities in Florida
Populated places on the Intracoastal Waterway in Florida
Cities in Miami metropolitan area
Populated places established in 1945
1945 establishments in Florida